Fyodor Stepanovich Rokotov (Fedor Rokotov) (1736–December 24, 1808) was a distinguished Russian painter who specialized in portraits.

Fyodor Rokotov was born into a family of peasant serfs, belonging to the Repnins. Much in his biography is obscure. He studied art in Saint Petersburg Academy of Arts. After buying back his freedom at the end of the 1750s he became established as a fashionable painter.

In 1765, Rokotov was elected an Academician, but he did not work as a professor in the Academy long, because it interfered with his painting. He returned to Moscow in 1765, where he lived for the rest of his life. He had a lot of commissions there, becoming one of the best portrait painters of his time.

Among his best-known portraits are Portrait of Alexandra Struyskaya (1772), sometimes called the Russian Mona Lisa and admittedly the most celebrated piece of the 18th-century Russian painting; Portrait of Countess Elisabeth Santi (1785), and Lady in a Pink Dress (1770s, illustration, right).

Rokotov avoided painting formal portraits with much adornment and decoration. Instead he was one of the first Russian painters advancing a psychological portrait with attention to optical and atmospheric effects.

Selected works

See also
 List of Russian artists

References
V.N. Alexandrov History of Russian Art, Minsk, 2004,  (In Russian)

External links

Online gallery of Rokotov paintings

1736 births
1808 deaths
18th-century painters from the Russian Empire
Russian male painters
19th-century painters from the Russian Empire
Painters from Saint Petersburg
Imperial Academy of Arts alumni
Russian portrait painters
Russian serfs
Members of the Imperial Academy of Arts
19th-century male artists from the Russian Empire